Magnus Powell (born 28 October 1974) is a Swedish football coach and a former striker who is the head coach of Östersund.

Club career
Powell was born in Örnsköldsvik to English footballer Ronald Powell. He played in the Swedish Allsvenskan from 1995–1999 for Helsingborgs IF and Örebro SK. He was an important part of the 1999 Helsingborg team that won the championship in Sweden scoring 8 goals in 24 matches. At the start of the 2000-season Powell was sold to Lillestrøm SK for £350,000 to replace Icelandic international Heiðar Helguson. Although he has struggled with injuries Powell has been a key-member of the Lillestrøm squad since arriving in 2000, scoring 29 goals in 73 league matches. During his last seasons with Lillestrøm he was the team captain. On 26 January 2006, Magnus Powell was transferred from Lillestrøm to FC Lyn Oslo for NOK 500,000. His active career as a player was ended in the Swedish team GIF Sundsvall, where he also was the assistant coach.

International career 
Powell represented the Sweden U17, U19, and U21 teams a combined total of 29 times, scoring 5 goals.

Honours
Allsvenskan:
Winner: 1999
Runner-up: 1994, 1995, 1998
Svenska Cupen:
Winner: 1997–98
Norwegian Premier League:
Runner-up: 2001
Norwegian Cup:
Runner-up: 2005

References

External links
Profile at lyn.no

1974 births
Living people
Swedish footballers
Örebro SK players
Helsingborgs IF players
Lyn Fotball players
GIF Sundsvall players
Lillestrøm SK players
Expatriate footballers in Norway
Swedish expatriate footballers
Swedish expatriate sportspeople in Norway
Allsvenskan players
Eliteserien players
People from Örnsköldsvik Municipality
Association football forwards
Swedish football managers
Swedish expatriate football managers
Expatriate football managers in Norway
Egersunds IK managers
Sandefjord Fotball managers
Eliteserien managers
Östersunds FK managers
Sportspeople from Västernorrland County